Rico Gatson is a multidisciplinary artist working from Brooklyn, New York, whose work draws from his African-American background. Through his art, he provides social commentary on significant moments in African-American history. His work combines abstract patterns with vibrant colors, which creates confrontational work that references African American culture and history.

Early life and education 
Rico Gatson was born in Augusta, Georgia in 1966 but grew up in Riverside, California. His parents, a nurse and a landscaper contractor, migrated to the East Coast during the Great Migration and joined the newly formed Black middle class. In the 1980s, attended Bethel College in Minnesota as an undergraduate. He changed his degree from graphic design to fine art, receiving his Bachelor's of Fine Arts degree in 1989. For his Master of Fine Arts degree, he attended Yale School of Art in 1991. During his time at school, he studied sculpture under artist David von Schlegell.

He completed his artist residency at Franconia Sculpture Park, Taylor Falls in 1998 and was an Artist in Residence at the Wright Museum of Art of Beloit College. Afterward, Gatson pursued his career in art from Bushwick, a Brooklyn neighborhood in New York City.

Art 
Gatson's art practice explores themes of Black history and identity. Many of his works critique the injustices in African-American history often referencing Black culture by appropriating images of famous figures, riots, and African textile design. Stylistically, his work usually incorporates vivid geometric patterns, working with conceptualism and abstraction, to imbue a mystical curiosity in the viewer. His assertive pieces captivate spectators with visual elements in order to emphasize their socio-political context later on.

Being an interdisciplinary artist, Gatson works with many different mediums such as painting, sculpture, photography, video, and installations. When asked in a recent interview, he mentions that to him 'It is about having experiences in multiple materials in order to provide a form for the ideas.' However, a common aspect in all his works is its polychromatic nature. He is well known for his paintings which exhibit this aspect. Kaleidoscopic motifs are also incorporated in his videos and portraits of Black heroes, such as James Baldwin, Martin Luther King Jr., the Black Panthers, Muhammad Ali, and President Obama.
 
His work has been exhibited nationally and internationally at places such as The Smithsonian American Art Museum in D.C., The Studio Museum in Harlem in New York, The Essl Museum in Austria.

Beacons

In 2019, Gatson had created a series of mosaic portraits for the Bronx Subway Station. The piece, titled Beacons, was exhibited in 167 St. Station, and the eight portraits celebrated iconic African-American and Latino figures; those who were depicted included Tito Puente, Justice Sonia Sotomayor, Audre Lorde, Celia Cruz, James Baldwin, Reggie Jackson, Maya Angelou, and Gil Scott-Heron. Beacons is an extension of his first New York museum solo, Icons.

The geometric lines that primarily use the Pan-African colors, red, green, and black allude to beams of light, emphasizing the beauty and pride that is associated with the cultural figures. The colors used in the mosaics are also common in many of Gatson's other paintings such as those seen in When She Speaks. His panels paintings also incorporate the aforementioned colors to reference African culture as a whole.

When She Speaks

Gatson's 2014 solo exhibition, When She Speaks, is exemplar of Gatson's multidisciplinary approach to making art. Not only were paintings included but photo collage, sculpture, and video as well. The focus of the exhibition was a short video that played footage of Black Panthers members Kathleen and Eldridge Cleaver responding to the injustice of their son, Bobby Hutton's death. Colorful kaleidoscopic edits were included in order to fragment and overlap the imagery, resulting in an unnerving atmosphere. Similar instances of such video effects can be seen in his solo show, The Promise of Light, 2013.

Selected exhibitions

Solo exhibitions

Studio Museum in Harlem, New York, NY, Icons, 2017

Studio 10, Brooklyn, New York, Rico Gatson: When She Speaks, 2014

Ronald Feldman Fine Arts, New York, NY, The Promise of Light, 2013

Cheekwood Museum of Art, Nashville, TN, African Fractals, 2006

Franklin Art Works, Minneapolis, MN, Rico Gatson: Recent Works, 2003

The Atlanta Contemporary Art Center, Atlanta, GA, Masking: Rico Gatson (Kindred) And Andres Serrano (Klansman), 2002

Pierogi 2000, Brooklyn, NY, Home Sweet Home, 1999

Group exhibitions

Essl Museum, Vienna, Austria, New, New York, 2013

The Tang Teaching Museum, Skidmore College, Saratoga Springs, NY, The Jewel Thief, 2011

Cynthia Broan Gallery, New York, NY, System Failure, 2007

The Santa Monica Museum of Art, Santa Monica, CA, Black Belt, December 11, 2005,

Studio Museum in Harlem, New York, NY, Black Belt, 2004

Brooklyn Museum of Art, Brooklyn, NY, Current Undercurrent:Working in Brooklyn, 1998

Awards 
 Louis Comfort Tiffany Foundation Biennial Award for Visual Artists, 2001
 Prized Pieces Video Award from the National Black Programming Consortium, Columbus, OH, 1991
 Oil Bar Ltd. Award for Excellence in Sculpture from Yale School of Art, New Haven, CT, 1991
 Pew Charitable Trust Graduate Fellowship, 1990

References

External links 
 http://ricogatson.com/

American video artists
American contemporary artists
African-American artists
African-American contemporary artists
1966 births
Living people
21st-century African-American people
20th-century African-American people